Thomas Hodges may refer to:

Politicians
Thomas Hodges (MP for Cricklade), member of parliament for Cricklade, 1640
Thomas Twisden Hodges (1809–1865), MP for Rochester
Thomas Hodges (Governor of Bombay) (died 1771), Governor of Bombay, 1767–1771
Thomas Law Hodges (1776–1857), English Liberal Party politician

Sportspeople
Thomas Hodges (volleyball) (born 1994), Australian male volleyball player
Tom Hodges (basketball) (born 1982), American college basketball coach
Tom Hodges (ice hockey) (born 1993), British-American ice hockey goaltender

Others
Thomas Hodges (artist) (born 1957), photographic artist
Thomas J. Hodges (1825–1856), western outlaw and physician known as the "Outlaw Doc" and Tom Bell
Tom Hodges (comics) (born 1972), American comics artist
Tom Hodges (actor) (born 1965), American actor and film producer